Venky Atluri is an Indian actor, screenwriter, and film director who works predominantly in Telugu cinema. He has directed more than three films.

Filmography 

All films are in Telugu unless otherwise noted.

References

External links 
 

Indian film directors
Living people
Telugu film directors
Year of birth missing (living people)

Telugu screenwriters
Tamil film directors
21st-century Indian film directors
Indian screenwriters